Arsenio is an American television sitcom that aired on ABC. The series starred Arsenio Hall and Vivica A. Fox. It aired from March 5 to April 23, 1997, with a total of 7 episodes produced.

Synopsis
Set in Atlanta, Georgia, Hall starred as Michael Atwood, the host of a sports cable show on ASTV in Atlanta. Michael is also newly married man with his lawyer wife Vivian Deveaux Atwood (Vivica A. Fox). His co-host is Al (Kevin Dunn), who Michael sometimes asks for advice on his home life. Living with Michael and Vicki, is Vicki's younger brother Matthew (Alimi Ballard), a Harvard graduate who is not ready to take on the real world. Shawnee Smith also co-starred as Vicki's free-spirited old college friend Laura who is always encouraging Vicki to let loose.

Cast
Arsenio Hall as Michael Atwood, the host of a cable sports television network
Vivica A. Fox as Vivian Deveaux-Atwood, a brilliant and dedicated attorney at a major law firm in the Georgia capital and Michael's wife
Kevin Dunn as Al O'Brien, Michael's co-anchor and good friend
Shawnee Smith as Laura Lauman, Vivian's best friend from college; a free-spirit
Alimi Ballard as Matthew Deveaux, Vivian's younger, Harvard University-educated brother

Episodes

References

External links

1990s American black sitcoms
1990s American sitcoms
1997 American television series debuts
1997 American television series endings
American Broadcasting Company original programming
English-language television shows
Television series about television
Television series by DreamWorks Television
Television shows set in Atlanta